Hai Rui (海瑞; Hǎi Ruì ; 23 January 1514 – 13 November 1587), courtesy name Ruxian (汝贤), art name Gangfeng (刚峰), was a Chinese scholar-official of the Ming dynasty, remembered as a model of honesty and integrity in office. A play based on his career, Hai Rui Dismissed from Office, gained political significance in the 1960s during the Cultural Revolution.

Biography

Hai Rui, was born in Qiongshan, Guangdong (modern-day Hainan) on January 23, 1513. His father died when he was three, and he was raised by his mother.  His great-great-grandfather was a native of Guangzhou named Hai Da-er (海答兒, Haidar, an Arabic name), and his mother was from a Muslim (Hui) family that originated from the Indian subcontinent. Hai Rui himself however was noted primarily as a Neo-Confucian and never discussed Islam in his Confucian works.

Hai took the Imperial examination but was unsuccessful, and his official career only began in 1553, when he was 39, with a humble position as clerk of education in Fujian. He gained a reputation for his uncompromising adherence to upright morality, scrupulous honesty, poverty, and fairness. This won him widespread popular support, evinced among other things by his being enshrined while alive; but he also made many enemies in the bureaucracy. Nevertheless, he was called to the capital Beijing and promoted to the junior position of secretary of ministry of Revenue. In 1565, he submitted a memorial strongly criticizing the Jiajing Emperor for the neglect of his duties and bringing disaster to the country, for which he was sentenced to death in 1566. He was released after the Emperor died in early 1567.

Hai Rui was reappointed as governor of South Zhili under the Longqing Emperor but was soon forced to resign in 1570 after complaints were made over his overzealous handling of land-tenure issues. Major moneylenders in the prefecture were accused of lending at exorbitant rates to smaller landowners, then seizing their lands as collateral. Hai Rui devoted considerable time to investigate these cases, pressing for the lands' return to their previous owners, but was in turn accused by officials of violating procedures and encouraging frivolous complaints and impeached by Tai Feng-Hsiang, a supervising secretary.

Hai Rui then spent 15 years in retirement in Hainan before being finally brought back to the Empire's "auxiliary capital" of Nanjing, in 1585, to serve under the Wanli Emperor. Hai Rui was promoted to censor-in-chief of Nanjing in 1586, but died in office a year later.

Legacy

In 1959, writer and scholar Wu Han became interested in the life of Hai Rui, and wrote several articles on his life and his fearless criticism of the emperor.  He then wrote a play for Peking Opera titled "Hai Rui Dismissed from Office", which he revised several times before the final version of 1961. Wu's play was interpreted by the Gang of Four member Yao Wenyuan as an allegorical work, in which the honest moral official Hai Rui representing the disgraced communist marshal Peng Dehuai, who was purged by Mao after criticizing the Great Leap Forward. According to Yao, the corrupt emperor in Wu's play represented Mao Zedong. The November 10, 1965, an article in a prominent Shanghai newspaper, "A Criticism of the Historical Drama 'Hai Rui Dismissed From Office'", written by Yao, began a propaganda campaign that eventually led to the Cultural Revolution. During the Cultural Revolution, the tomb of Hai Rui was destroyed, Hai Rui's body dug up and incinerated by Red Guards (the tomb has since been rebuilt). Yao's campaign led to the persecution and death of Wu Han, as well as others involved in related works, such as Zhou Xinfang for his opera Hai Rui Submits His Memorial.

While Wu Han considers Hai Rui to be a moral socialist, this was not necessarily the case. As historian Ray Huang puts it, "Though one might expect the moral interpretation of history to be generally discredited by now, this is not the case. Some modern historians tend to view the Confucian morality in of certain individuals in terms of the own sense of social justice. Wu Han, for instance, praises his hero Hai Jui for ‘standing on the side of peasantry’ in their conflict with the landlords. He also asserts that Hai, ‘despite a hundred setbacks, still continued the struggle to build a socialist society."

Haikou, the largest city on Hai Rui's home island of Hainan, celebrates Hai Rui's deeds. A memorial has been constructed and his tomb is open for worship.

References

External links
 
 A Preliminary Study of Hai Rui: His Biography in the Ming-Shih
 Coordinates of tomb linking to maps: 

1514 births
1587 deaths
16th-century Chinese people
Chinese scholars
Hui people
Ming dynasty politicians
People from Haikou
Politicians from Hainan
Chinese people of Indian descent